KKV may refer to:

 KKV (Kim Vadenhag), member of Swedish hip hop duo Norlie & KKV
 KKV guitar, an electric guitar
 King, Keohane & Verba, the authors of 'Designing Social Inquiry'
 Kinetic kill vehicle, a kinetic projectile
 Kirkelig Kulturverksted, a Norwegian record label
 Konkurrensverket, the Swedish Competition Authority